Rosebrook may refer to:

Rosebrook, New South Wales, a locality in Australia
Rosebrook, Victoria, a locality in Australia
Rose Brook, a river in New York
Mount Rosebrook, a mountain in New Hampshire
David Rosebrook